Furulund is a locality situated in Kävlinge Municipality, Skåne County, Sweden with 4,180 inhabitants in 2010.

Furulunds IK football club is located here.

References 

Populated places in Kävlinge Municipality
Populated places in Skåne County